K. M. Shamsul Huda (16 December 2010) is a Awami League politician and the former Member of Parliament of Undivided Dhaka-8.  He was one of the organizers and political advisor of Sector 2 of the Liberation War of Bangladesh.

Early life

Career
Huda was an educationist and a member of the central executive committee of the Awami League. He was one of the organizers and political advisor of the Bangladesh Liberation War.

He was elected to parliament from Undivided Dhaka-8 as a Bangladesh Awami League candidate in 1973.

He was the president of Munshiganj District Awami League from 1973 to 1980.

Death
Huda on 16 December 2010 in Bangabandhu Sheikh Mujib Medical University, Dhaka, Bangladesh.

References

1935 births
1st Jatiya Sangsad members
2010 deaths
Awami League politicians